Gringo is the seventh studio album released by the Ohio rock band Circus Devils in 2009.  All songs on Gringo were written and performed by Robert Pollard, Todd Tobias, and Tim Tobias.  The  first all-acoustic album released by Circus Devils, Gringo is a song cycle in which each track recounts a moment in the life of a nameless drifter known only as "the Gringo."  The moods on the album range widely between  jubilant to melancholy to mean.

Reaction 

Musically the album is filled with creepy film-score interludes and art-rock grinders, but also pretty and strange acoustic balladry. Like every Circus Devils album, it feels haunted, but those ghosts do less screaming and more gentle creeping and following.  And of course, nothing is as it seems. There’s a lot to savor and decipher throughout. With Gringo, you can get lulled into comfort, but then you’ll be stabbed in the face.  
– Dave Heaton for Erasing Clouds

The latest from Circus Devils once again proves that this vehicle has no rules, boundaries or expectations. This seventh release tells the story of Gringo in a simple, mostly acoustic form that still embraces the Circus Devils love for eclectic background noises but is their most straightforward set of accessible songs to date. You can call Gringo a statement, a step forward, a step backwards, or just the right step but the Circus Devils finalize the notion that trying to put a label on them remains impossible and that is what makes them worth seeking out!  
– Christopher Anthony for The Fire Note

Track listing

  Witness Hill
  Every Moment Flame On 
  Ships From Prison to Prison
  Bad Baby Blue
  Easy Baby
  Before it Walks
  Monkey Head
  The Beast Falls Down
  Letters From a Witch
  Arizona Blacktop Company 
  Hot Water Wine 
  In Your Hour of Rescue
  Ants 
  Stars On All Night
  The Gasoline Drinkers
  Yellow Cloud (inst.)

References

External links 
 the Official Circus Devils site
 [ Circus Devils at allmusic.com]
Circus Devils - Gringo - Album Review at Citizen Dick

Circus Devils albums
2009 albums
Concept albums